The 1912 United States presidential election in Ohio took place on November 5, 1912 as part of the 1912 United States presidential election. State voters chose 24 electors to the Electoral College, which selected the president and vice president.

Ohio was won by the Democratic nominee Woodrow Wilson and his running mate Thomas R. Marshall. As a result of his victory, Wilson became the first Democratic presidential candidate since Franklin Pierce in 1852 to win the state.

Ohio had been a Republican state since 1856, but broke tradition due to the strong performance by the Progressive Party (also known as the Bull Moose Party) led by Theodore Roosevelt, which ultimately split the Republican vote. Theodore Roosevelt was able to gain 22.16 percent of the popular vote - though trailed the Republican Party nominee William Howard Taft, an Ohio native, who won 26.82% of the popular vote, and Wilson of the Democratic Party who won 40.96% of the popular vote. It marked Ohio's shift from a reliably Republican state to a bellwether state, as it would vote for the winning candidate in every presidential election thereafter except 1944, 1960, and 2020.

Results

Results by county

See also
 United States presidential elections in Ohio

Notes

References

1912 Ohio elections
Ohio
1912